Vandebilt Catholic High School is a private diocesan co-educational institution for grades 8-12 located in Terrebonne Parish, Louisiana and in the Roman Catholic Diocese of Houma-Thibodaux. It is located in the unincorporated area of Bayou Cane, near Houma.

History
Vandebilt was founded by the Marianites of Holy Cross in 1870 as Our Lady of the Sacred Heart Academy (then as St. Francis de Sales Catholic High School from 1879 until 1965, and later Houma Central Catholic High School until 1966) and continued by the Brothers of the Sacred Heart.

The school primarily serves Catholic students of Terrebonne Parish. A college preparatory curriculum is offered as the school stresses a religious approach to the education of the whole student through academic, athletic, and co-curricular programs.

Vandebilt Catholic was named after Father August Vandebilt (November 10, 1866 - April 7, 1938), who was born in the Netherlands. He was ordained into the priesthood at the American College of Louvain on June 29, 1890.  Father Vandebilt died in his position as pastor of the Church of St. Francis de Sales in Houma, Louisiana.

On March 27, 1966, Houma Central Catholic High School was named in honor of Father Vandebilt on the occasion of his birth centenary.

Mascot
The mascot of Vandebilt Catholic High School is the Boston Terrier (by appearance), though known as the "Fightin' Terriers."

Athletics
Vandebilt Catholic athletics competes in the LHSAA.

Championships
Football Championships
(1) State Championship: 1959

Baseball Championships
(12) State Championships: 1953, 1954,  1955, 1956, 1957, 1959, 1961, 1962, 1963, 1965, 1971, 2022

Girls' Basketball Championships
(1) State Championship: 2010

Softball Championships
(14) State Championships: 1980, 1981, 1982, 1983, 1984, 1985, 1988, 1990, 1993, 1996, 1999, 2006, 2008, 2010

Volleyball Championships
(1) State Championship: 2017

Girls' Tennis Championships
(5) State Championships: 1996, 2008, 2009, 2010, 2011

Boys' Tennis Championships
(8) State Championships: 1998, 2008, 2009, 2010, 2011, 2014, 2015, 2016

Noted alumni
Tab Benoit (Class of 1985)- recording artist
Chuck Bush (Class of 1979)  - actor, Fandango
Marty J. Chabert - state senator for Terrebonne and Lafourche parishes, 1992-1996
Karl Morgan (Class of 1979) - American football player, Tampa Bay Buccaneers, Houston Oilers, Saskatchewan Roughriders; coach, Alcorn State University (defensive co-ordinator), University of North Alabama (defensive co-ordinator) 
Greg Rodrigue (Class of 2007) -  Division 1-A Rugby Player, Professional Rugby League Player, Boston Thirteens, Portugal national rugby league team
Theresa Plaisance (Class of 2010) - professional basketball player
Elijah McGuire (Class of 2013), NFL running back for the Kansas City Chiefs
Jay Clune (Class of 1982), President, Nicholls State University

References

External links
 Vandebilt's website

Educational institutions established in 1870
Catholic secondary schools in Louisiana
Schools in Terrebonne Parish, Louisiana
1870 establishments in Louisiana